The Town of Brookside is a Statutory Town located in Fremont County, Colorado, United States. The town population was 236 at the 2020 United States Census. Brookside is a part of the Cañon City, CO Micropolitan Statistical Area.

Geography
Brookside is located at  (38.413513, -105.190734).

Demographics

As of the census of 2000, there were 219 people, 85 households, and 62 families residing in the town. The racial makeup of the town was 96.35% White, 0.46% Native American, 0.46% from other races, and 2.74% from two or more races. Hispanic or Latino of any race were 10.96% of the population.

There were 85 households, out of which 28.2% had children under the age of 18 living with them, 63.5% were married couples living together, 5.9% had a female householder with no husband present, and 25.9% were non-families. 23.5% of all households were made up of individuals, and 11.8% had someone living alone who was 65 years of age or older.  The average household size was 2.58 and the average family size was 3.02.

In the town, the population was spread out, with 23.3% under the age of 18, 5.5% from 18 to 24, 26.9% from 25 to 44, 26.0% from 45 to 64, and 18.3% who were 65 years of age or older.  The median age was 42 years. For every 100 females, there were 97.3 males.  For every 100 females age 18 and over, there were 102.4 males.

The median income for a household in the town was $34,688, and the median income for a family was $40,833. Males had a median income of $33,333 versus $26,875 for females. The per capita income for the town was $14,841.  About 13.8% of families and 13.7% of the population were below the poverty line, including 29.6% of those under the age of eighteen and none of those 65 or over.

See also

 List of municipalities in Colorado

References

External links

 
 CDOT map of the Town of Brookside

Towns in Fremont County, Colorado
Towns in Colorado